Dorice Reid (February 26, 1929 - August 17, 2017) was an outfielder who played from  through  in the All-American Girls Professional Baseball League. She was born in Superior, Wisconsin.

Nicknamed ״Dorrie״, Reid was a light-hitting outfielder during her four years in the AAGPBL. She entered the circuit in 1948 with the expansion Chicago Colleens, playing for them one year before joining the Grand Rapids Chicks (1949–1951).

Her most productive came in 1950, when she hit a .199 batting average with 78 hits and 43 stolen bases in 107 games, all career numbers.

Following her baseball career, Reid settled in Vista, California.

In 1988, Dorice Reid became part of Women in Baseball, a permanent display based at the Baseball Hall of Fame and Museum in Cooperstown, New York, which was unveiled to honor the entire All-American Girls Professional Baseball League.

Career statistics
Batting

Fielding

Sources

All-American Girls Professional Baseball League players
Baseball players from Wisconsin
Sportspeople from Superior, Wisconsin
People from Vista, California
1929 births
2017 deaths
21st-century American women